
Bhupinder Singh may refer to:

Entertainment
 Bhupinder Singh (musician) (1940–2022), Indian singer and musician popularly known by his first name
 Bhupinder Singh (actor) (born 1970), Indian actor

Politics
 Bhupinder Singh (politician) (born 1951), Indian politician from Odisha
 Bhupinder Singh of Patiala (1891–1938), Maharaja of Patiala

Sports
 Bhupinder Singh (Indian cricketer) (born 1965), Punjab and Indian cricketer, aka Bhupinder Singh Snr
 Bhupinder Singh (cricketer, born 1970), Punjab cricketer, aka Bhupinder Singh Jnr
 Bhupinder Singh (New Zealand cricketer) (born 1986), New Zealand cricketer
 Bhupinder Singh (athlete) (born 1984), Indian athlete in 2005 Asian Athletics Championships

See also
 Bhupinder, an Indian male name
 Bhupinder Singh Brar (1926–1995), Indian politician from Punjab
 Bhupinder Singh Hooda (born 1947), Indian politician
 Bhupinder Singh Mann (born 1939), Indian activist and member of the Rajya Sabha
 Singh, a title, middle name, or surname which originated in India